White Rock Township is a township in Republic County, Kansas, in the United States.

History
White Rock Township was named from the White Rock Creek in the northwestern part.

References

Townships in Republic County, Kansas
Townships in Kansas